Xiong Foxi (1900 − 26 October 1965) was an American-educated Chinese playwright famous for his experimental drama in the Ding County, Hebei Province (1932–37). His ambition was creating the peasants' drama of educative value. One of the plays, Sleeping on Brushwood and Tasting Gall (Woxin changdan) popularized the topic of "national humiliation" through the image of Goujian, the Yue king of the Spring and Autumn period. He was the first President of the Shanghai Theatre Academy.

Literature 
Paul A. Cohen, Speaking to history: the story of King Goujian in twentieth-century China. 2009.

1900 births
1965 deaths
Chinese dramatists and playwrights
Writers from Jiangxi